Natal Ridge is a prominent snow-free terraced ridge forming part of the north boundary of the Two Step Cliffs massif located in the southeast portion of Alexander Island, Antarctica. Named by United Kingdom Antarctic Place-Names Committee (UK-APC) in 1993 in recognition of the geomorphological and biological surveys conducted by scientists from the University of Natal in the Mars Glacier party.

See also

 Balan Ridge
 Phobos Ridge
 Polarstar Ridge

Ridges of Alexander Island